Yang Woo-suk (born October 24, 1969) is a South Korean film director and manhwaga. His first film was the critical and commercial hit The Attorney (2013).

Career 
Born in Seoul in 1969, Yang Woo-suk graduated from Korea University with degrees in English Literature and Philosophy. He became a cartoonist, writing webtoons such as If Thou Must Love Me (2008-2009) and Steel Rain (2011-2012).

Yang also began working in the film industry mainly as a producer for the companies MBC Productions, SK Independence, and All That Story, doing such tasks as production planning, investment supervision and recruiting new directors. He became interested in film technology and taught himself about HD and CGI; he produced the HD film Desire in 2004 and became the creative planning director at computer graphics company Locus.

Yang's debut as a filmmaker came relatively late in life in his mid-forties, when he co-wrote and directed courtroom drama The Attorney, a fictionalized account of former South Korean president Roh Moo-hyun's early years as a human rights lawyer in 1980s Busan. It was loosely based on the "Burim" case of 1981, when the Chun Doo-hwan regime arrested without warrants 22 students and teachers who belonged to a book-reading club on charges that they were North Korea sympathizers. Yang said, "I am interested in films that tell stories of people who struggle hard to stick to their beliefs when they come into conflict with outside environments. [...] I wanted to grasp the very moment when a man dramatically and radically changed." At first Yang had difficulty getting funding for a film with real-life historical figures given the sensitive political climate, but those pre-production budgetary woes eased when top actor Song Kang-ho was cast as the protagonist. Released in late 2013, The Attorney became an unexpected box office sensation, drawing 11,375,954 admissions as it reminded older viewers of the country's politically charged past and provided younger viewers with a window into that era. It became the ninth film in Korean cinema history to reach 10 million admissions, and became (at the time) the 8th highest grossing Korean film of all time. The Attorney received multiple awards and nominations domestically, particularly for Song who received rave reviews for his performance. Notably, it won four awards at the 35th Blue Dragon Film Awards, including Best Film, Best Actor for Song, Best Supporting Actress for Kim Young-ae, and Popular Star Award for Yim Si-wan. Yang also won several Best New Director prizes, from the 19th Chunsa Film Art Awards, the 50th Baeksang Arts Awards (where Song won the Grand Prize and The Attorney won Best Film), the 14th Director's Cut Awards, the 34th Korean Association of Film Critics Awards, and the 51st Grand Bell Awards (where Yang also won Best Screenplay).

Filmography

Webtoons 
If Thou Must Love Me (2008-2009)
V (2009)
Steel Rain (2011-2012)

Awards 
2014 19th Chunsa Film Art Awards: Best New Director (The Attorney)
2014 50th Baeksang Arts Awards: Best New Director (The Attorney)
2014 14th Director's Cut Awards: Best New Director (The Attorney)
2014 34th Korean Association of Film Critics Awards: Best New Director (The Attorney)
2014 51st Grand Bell Awards: Best New Director; Best Screenplay (The Attorney)

References

External links 
 
 
 

1969 births
Living people
South Korean film directors
South Korean screenwriters
South Korean webtoon creators
South Korean manhwa artists
South Korean manhwa writers
Korea University alumni
People from Seoul